The Bogdashkina is a river in the Sakha Republic (Yakutia), Russia.

The river flows north of the Arctic Circle, across desolate territories of the Allaikhovsky District.

Course
Not counting the New Siberian Islands the Bogdashkina is the northernmost sizeable river basin of Yakutia. It has its sources in a small unnamed lake of the northern end of the East Siberian Lowland. The river flows roughly northeastwards across the tundra in the uppermost section of its course. Then it flows eastwards, with its channel meandering all along. In its last stretch the Bogdashkina turns north and its mouth widens as it empties into the East Siberian Sea, roughly halfway between Khroma Bay and Gusinaya Bay. Lake Mogotoyevo, a coastal lagoon, lies to the east of the river mouth.

Tributaries  
There are many small lakes in the basin, including Shilikino lake just west of the last stretch of the Bogdashkina.

Fauna
In the summer the river mouth area is a breeding place for migratory birds, including waders and the spectacled eider.

See also
List of rivers of Russia

References

External links 
Fishing & Tourism in Yakutia
14401 Подходы к устью реки Богдашкина (Масштаб 1:100 000)

Drainage basins of the East Siberian Sea
Rivers of the Sakha Republic
East Siberian Lowland